The Garden of the Righteous in Warsaw is a memorial site in Wola, Muranów. The initiators of the idea are the History Meeting House and the Italian foundation GARIWO. It is a place to honour those who, during the 20th and 21st centuries, in the face of totalitarianism and genocide, had the courage to defend human dignity. Each year, on the European Day of the Righteous (established by the European Parliament in 2012), the Garden Committee, announces the names of those to be honoured with that title. The garden was designed by Barbara Kraus-Galińska's landscape architecture studio.

Location 
The garden is located on the Jerzy Jur-Gorzechowski square, on the site of the former "Serbia" women's prison, between Dzielna and Pawia streets, near John Paul II avenue and the Church of St. Augustine.

Opening ceremony 
The Garden was inaugurated on 5 June 2014 in a city that experienced the two totalitarian regimes of the 20th century, Nazism and Communism. The date was not chosen by chance: it was decided to open the Garden the day after the 25th anniversary of the first semi-free elections in Poland, June 4, 1989, which then led to the fall of communism.

The idea of entwining the globe with a network of Gardens of the Righteous, created to honour attitudes of people who protected dignity and life of men in totalitarian systems or at times of mass crimes, originated at the Italian Gariwo Foundation, and the Garden of Monte Stella in Milan, Italy, however, it is not devoted only to those who helped Jews during the war.

Honored 
Each honored person has its memorial trees will be planted and symbolic stones.

See also 
 European Day of the Righteous

References 

Monuments and memorials in Warsaw
Parks in Warsaw
Polish Righteous Among the Nations
Holocaust memorials in Poland